Isakas Anolikas (1903–1943) was a Lithuanian cyclist. Anolikas was part of the Makabi sport club, established in 1920. He represented Lithuania at the 1924 Summer Olympics in Paris and at the 1928 Summer Olympics in Amsterdam. Both times he did not finish the individual time trial over 188 km due to technical malfunctions. Anolikas was Lithuanian champion: in 1925 and 1926 he won individual 10 km race, in 1926 he won gold in team 70 km race. He was killed during the Holocaust: as a Jew, he was shot at the Ninth Fort in Kaunas.

References

1903 births
1943 deaths
Sportspeople from Šiauliai
People from Shavelsky Uyezd
Lithuanian Jews
Jews from the Russian Empire
Lithuanian male cyclists
Olympic cyclists of Lithuania
Cyclists at the 1924 Summer Olympics
Cyclists at the 1928 Summer Olympics
Jewish sportspeople
People murdered in Lithuania
Deaths by firearm in Lithuania
Lithuanian Jews who died in the Holocaust
People executed by Nazi Germany by firing squad